The Job Mills Block is located in Lodi, Wisconsin, United States. It was added to the National Register of Historic Places in 2008.

History
The building was built by English immigrant Job Mills. Historically, it has been used as a specialty store and a post office. It is currently a restaurant.

Job Mills' brother, Richard, owned the Richard W. and Margaret Mills House, which is also listed on the National Register of Historic Places.

References

Buildings and structures in Columbia County, Wisconsin
Commercial buildings completed in 1895
Commercial buildings on the National Register of Historic Places in Wisconsin
Lodi, Wisconsin
National Register of Historic Places in Columbia County, Wisconsin
1895 establishments in Wisconsin